Stingray Loud  is a Canadian English language discretionary specialty channel owned by Stingray Digital. The channel broadcasts music videos relating to rock, modern rock, alternative, punk, and heavy metal.

History

In November 2000, CHUM Limited was granted approval from the Canadian Radio-television and Telecommunications Commission (CRTC) to launch MuchLoud, described as "a national English-language Category 2 music video specialty television service dedicated exclusively to alternative, hard rock, metal and punk music or alternative music-related programming."

The channel was launched on September 7, 2001 as MuchLoud, fashioned after the former MuchMusic original program, Loud. The channel aired primarily music videos with a small selection of other programming including concerts and interviews. Existing MuchMusic rock music video programs were aired on a more frequent & regular basis on MuchLoud, such as The Punk Show, the network's eponymous metal block Loud, and the alternative rock program The Wedge.

In July 2006, Bell Globemedia (later called CTVglobemedia) announced that it would purchase CHUM for an estimated $1.7 billion CAD, included in the sale was MuchLoud. The sale was subject to CRTC approval and was approved in June 2007, with the transaction completed on June 22, 2007.

While the channel, from its inception, had always been an ad-supported service, on August 31, 2009, commercial advertising was dropped from the music video portion of the channel's schedule. The only remaining commercials existed in programs such as concerts or other special programming. Meanwhile, sister stations MuchMusic and MuchMoreMusic would continue to run commercials to this day.

On September 10, 2010, BCE, Inc. (a minority shareholder in CTVglobemedia) announced that it planned to acquire 100% interest in CTVglobemedia for a total debt and equity transaction cost of $3.2 billion CAD. The deal which required CRTC approval, was approved on March 7, 2011 and closed on April 1 of that year, on which CTVglobemedia was rebranded Bell Media.

On June 21, 2016, it was announced that Stingray Digital Group announced that it would acquire MuchLoud and its sister stations from Bell Media at a price-tag later revealed to be $4 million for all 4 channels. The deal for MuchLoud would later close on August 15, 2016, with MuchLoud rebranded as Stingray Loud on August 12, 2016. On June 1, 2017, Stingray announced the completion of the rebranding process for all 4 channels, which included new programming and a national promotional campaign. With the rebrand, all non-music video programming was removed from the channel.

The channel started running commercials again in later parts of 2019, this time to match Stingray's rock radio stations.

Programming
21st Century Rock
Alt-Rock Classics Weekend
Big Shiny Rock
Daily Video Hits
Forever Loud
Hair Metal Madness
Metal at Midnight
Rock Number Ones
Stingray Loud Top 15
Tailgate Rock

Former Programming (as MuchLoud)
Loud
LoudTested
PunchMuch
The Punk Show
The Wedge

References

External links
 Official site
Channel description

L
Commercial-free television networks
Music video networks in Canada
Television channels and stations established in 2001
Digital cable television networks in Canada
English-language television stations in Canada